Silgo is a town in the Bingo Department of Boulkiemdé Province in central western Burkina Faso.

Demographics

Silgo has a population of 1,639.

References

Populated places in Boulkiemdé Province